Winthrop Public Schools (WPS) is the school district of Winthrop, Maine.

Cornelia Brown served as superintendent until July 1, 2020. In February 2020, the school board chose James Hodgkin as the person who will become superintendent on July 1, 2020.

Schools 
 Winthrop High School
 Winthrop Middle School
 Winthrop Grade School

References

External links
 

School districts in Maine
Education in Kennebec County, Maine
Winthrop, Maine